Sergej Tica (born August 13, 1974) is a Kosovo-born Bosnian football player.

References

External sources
 
 Profile and photo at Angelfire
 
 

1974 births
Living people
Sportspeople from Pristina
Association football midfielders
Bosnia and Herzegovina footballers
FK Hajduk Beograd players
FK Borac Banja Luka players
FK Budućnost Valjevo players
FK Milicionar players
FC Prishtina players
Paniliakos F.C. players
FC Stal Alchevsk players
FC Stal-2 Alchevsk players
FK Željezničar Sarajevo players
NK Čelik Zenica players
Second League of Serbia and Montenegro players
Super League Greece players
Ukrainian Premier League players
Ukrainian Second League players
Premier League of Bosnia and Herzegovina players
Bosnia and Herzegovina expatriate footballers
Expatriate footballers in Greece
Bosnia and Herzegovina expatriate sportspeople in Greece
Expatriate footballers in Ukraine
Bosnia and Herzegovina expatriate sportspeople in Ukraine
Expatriate footballers in Germany
Bosnia and Herzegovina expatriate sportspeople in Germany
Kosovan expatriate sportspeople in Germany